County Road 611 or County Route 611 may refer to the following:

County Road 611 (Indian River County, Florida), formerly State Road 611
County Road 611 (Pinellas County, Florida), a major north-south route that includes the Bayside Bridge
County Road 611 (St. Lucie County, Florida), formerly State Road 611
County Route 611 (Atlantic County, New Jersey)
County Route 611 (Burlington County, New Jersey)
County Route 611 (Camden County, New Jersey)
County Route 611 (Cape May County, New Jersey)
County Route 611 (Cumberland County, New Jersey)
County Route 611 (Essex County, New Jersey)
County Route 611 (Gloucester County, New Jersey)
County Route 611 (Hudson County, New Jersey)
County Route 611 (Hunterdon County, New Jersey)
County Route 611 (Mercer County, New Jersey)
County Route 611 (Middlesex County, New Jersey)
County Route 611 (Morris County, New Jersey)
County Route 611 (Ocean County, New Jersey)
County Route 611 (Passaic County, New Jersey)
County Route 611 (Salem County, New Jersey)
County Route 611 (Sussex County, New Jersey)
County Route 611 (Union County, New Jersey)
County Route 611 (Warren County, New Jersey)